Gilligan is a fictional character played by Bob Denver on the 1960s TV show Gilligan's Island.

Gilligan may also refer to:

 , a John C. Butler-class destroyer escort
 Gilligan (surname)
 "Gilligan (Space Ghost Coast to Coast)", an episode of Space Ghost Coast to Coast

See also

Gillig, American bus manufacturer